Saint-Sulpice-Auteuil is a railway station located in Saint-Sulpice near Auteuil in the Oise department, France.  It is served by TER Hauts-de-France trains from Paris-Nord to Beauvais.

See also
List of SNCF stations in Hauts-de-France

References

Railway stations in Oise